"Choose" is a pop and contemporary R&B song performed by Color Me Badd and the second single from their second album Time and Chance. The song is about being so in love with someone, to the point that they will do what they don't want to do because of their love, and will do anything for that person, even it means dying for them, despite being heartbroken.

The song peaked at No. 23 on the Billboard Hot 100 on February 19, 1994 (their second consecutive song to peak at the spot). The group would later admit that they felt the song should have been the lead single from the album and regret not making it such.

Track listings
US Vinyl, 12, Promo"
A1 Choose (Dem Kidz' Extended Radio Mix)	4:18
A2 Choose (Dem Kidz' Street 3!@&)	4:17
A3 Choose (Just The Beat Mix)	4:17
A4 Choose (CMB Cool Mix)	4:22
B1 Choose (Dave's Extended Radio Mix)	3:51
B2 Choose (Dave's Extended Beat Mix)	6:15
B3 Choose (Dem Kidz' Extended Mix Instrumental)	4:18
B4 Choose (Album Version)	3:51

US Vinyl, 7"
A Choose (Radio Edit)	4:00
B Choose (Album Version) 4:23

US CD, Single, Promo"
1 Choose (Radio Edit) 4:00
2 Choose (Version #1) 3:54
3 Choose (Version #2) 3:34
4 Choose (Version #3) 3:54
5 Choose (Version #4) 4:23

US CD, Maxi-Single"
1 Choose 4:22
2 Choose (Dem Kidz' Radio Edit)
3 Choose (Dave's Radio Edit)
4 Choose (CMB Cool Mix)
5 Choose (Dem Kidz' Street #!@&)
6 Choose (Dave's Beat Mix Edit)
7 Choose (Dave's Guitar Mix Edit)

US Cassette, Single, Dol"
A Choose (Radio Edit) 4:00
B Choose (Album Version) 4:23

Personnel
Credits and personnel adapted from Time and Chance album liner notes.
Arranged By [Vocal Arrangements] – Color Me Badd
Engineer – Steve Hodge
Instruments [All], Arranged By [Rhythm Arrangements] – Jimmy Jam And Terry Lewis*
Producer – Jimmy Jam And Terry Lewis*
Written-By – Color Me Badd, James Harris III, Terry Lewis

Charts

References

1994 songs
1994 singles
Color Me Badd songs
Giant Records (Warner) singles
Songs written by Sam Watters
Songs written by Jimmy Jam and Terry Lewis